Calliostoma doncorni is a species of sea snail, a marine gastropod mollusk in the family Calliostomatidae.

Some authors place this taxon in the subgenus Calliostoma (Tristichotrochus).

Description

Distribution
This species occurs in the Pacific Ocean off Hawaii.

References

External links

doncorni
Gastropods described in 1979